Mount Irving is a mountain rising to ca.  that is the dominant elevation on Clarence Island, in the South Shetland Islands. The rounded, heavily glaciated mountain is situated in Urda Ridge occupying the southern part of the island. A prominent feature, the mountain doubtless was known to sealers in the area in the 1820s. It was named by United Kingdom Antarctic Place-Names Committee (UK-APC) for Rear Admiral Sir Edmund George Irving, Royal Navy, Hydrographer of the Navy, 1960–66. First ascent by a team comprising Capt. Crispin Agnew, John Hult and George Bruce of the Joint Services Expedition to Elephant Island on 6 December 1970.

See also
List of Ultras of Antarctica

Notes

Irving